This is a list of countries by total greenhouse gas (GHG) annual emissions in 2016. It is based on data for carbon dioxide, methane, nitrous oxide, perfluorocarbons (PFCs), sulfur hexafluoride (SF6) and hydrofluorocarbons (HFCs) emissions compiled by the World Resources Institute (WRI). The table below separately provides emissions data calculated on the basis of production, respectively consumption of goods and services in each country. WRI data includes emissions from land-use, land-use change and forestry, Global Carbon Project data does not. The unit used is megatonnes of carbon dioxide equivalent (MtCO2e) using the 100-year time horizon, like the UNFCCC. All countries which are party to the Paris Agreement report their greenhouse gas inventories at least biennially from 2024.

List of countries by production-based and consumption-based emissions

See also 

 List of countries by carbon dioxide emissions
 List of countries by carbon dioxide emissions per capita
 List of countries by greenhouse gas emissions per person
 List of countries by renewable electricity production
 Asian brown cloud
 Climate change
 Land use, land-use change, and forestry

References

countries, Greenhouse
Greenhouse gas emissions
Greenhouse gas emissions
Greenhouse gas emissions
Greenhouse gas emissions

Greenhouse gas